K. Ravi Shankar is an Indian film director born as  Krishnamoorthy Ravi Shankar,  best known for his Bollywood films of the late 1980s and early 1990s. He is the son of noted Bollywood producer A. Krishnamoorthy.He has mostly directed films for his home banner Tina Films International.
He has worked with many top Bollywood actors when their respective careers were in their infancy such as Govinda in Dariya Dil in 1988 and Shilpa Shetty in Aag in 1994. 
Shankar has also produced several films including Swarag Se Sunder  in 1986 and Gharana in 1989.

Filmography
Sindoor (1987)
Dariya Dil (1988)
Gharana (1989)
Benaam Badsha (1991)
Meera Ka Mohan (1992)
Apradhi (1992)
Sadhna (1993)
Meherbaan (1993)
Aag (1994)
Mere Do Anmol Ratan (1998)
Kuch Tum Kaho Kuch Hum Kahein (2002)
Iqraar: By Chance (2006)

External links

References

20th-century Indian film directors
Hindi-language film directors
Year of birth missing (living people)
Living people